Barbara Lynn Stark (born July 6, 1937), also known by her married name Barbara Jordan, is an American former competition swimmer.  Stark represented the United States as a 15-year-old at the 1952 Summer Olympics in Helsinki, Finland.  She competed in the women's 100-meter backstroke, advanced to the event final, and finished fifth with a time of 1:16.2.

Her son, Hartwell Jordan, competed in sailing (Soling) at the 2000 Olympic Games in Sydney. 

Her nephew, Jonathan Stark, is a former professional tennis player.

References

External links
 

1937 births
Living people
American female backstroke swimmers
Olympic swimmers of the United States
Swimmers from Berkeley, California
Swimmers at the 1952 Summer Olympics
20th-century American women